Australian country music singer Beccy Cole has released ten studio albums, one live album and one compilation.

Albums

Studio albums

Live albums

Compilation albums

Video albums
 Just a Girl Singer (2 August 2004) ABC Country / Universal Music Australia No. 6 AUS DVD

Singles
 "Foolin' Around" (1993)
 "Hearts Changing Hands" (1996)
 "Rest in Pieces" (1996)
 "This Heart" (2000) No. 227 AUS 
 "Life Goes On" (2002)
 "Little Victories" (2003)
 "Men Don't Dance Anymore" (2003)
 "Sorry I Asked" (2004)
 "Rainbows, Dreams And Butterflies" (2005)
 "Poster Girl (Wrong Side of the World)" (2006)
 "Lifeboat" (2007)
 "Here You Come Again" (2010)
 "Shiny Things" (2011)
 "Waitress" (2012)
 "9 to 5"  (with Melinda Schneider)  (2014)
 "Love Hurts"  (with Melinda Schneider) (2015)
 "Broken Soldiers" (2015)
 "Sweet Rebecca" (2015)
 "F U Cancer" (Catherine Britt with Kasey Chambers, Lyn Bowtell, Josh Pyke, Wes Carr and Wendy Matthews) (2016)
 "Anyone Who Isn't Me Tonight"  (with Adam Harvey)  (2017)
 "Lioness" (2018)

Music videos
 "Foolin' Around" (1993)
 "This Heart" (2000)
 "Life Goes On" (2002)
 "Little Victories" (2003)
 "Sorry I Asked" (2004)
 "Rainbows, Dreams And Butterflies" (2005)
 "Poster Girl (Wrong Side of the World)" (2006)
 "Shiny Things" (2011)
 "Waitress" (2012)
 "Love Hurts"  (with Melinda Schneider) (2015)
 "Broken Soldiers" (2015)
 "Sweet Rebecca" (2015)
 "Lioness" (2018)

References

Country music discographies
Discographies of Australian artists